The 2007–2008 Panonian League Season was the third season of the league. The previous season ended in 2004, and the league was abandoned for some years. Unlike in the past, the teams came from only two countries - Croatia and Serbia. The season lasted from October 12, 2007 to February 15, 2008. There were no playoffs.

Teams
 KHL Mladost
 KHL Zagreb
 HK Beostar
 HK Novi Sad
 HK Partizan
 HK Vojvodina
 KHK Crvena Zvezda

Final standings

Scoring Leaders

Games

Preseason
22/09/2007 Mladost - Crvena Zvezda 3-6 (0-1,0-2,3-3)
23/09/2007 Zagreb - Crvena Zvezda 1-3 (0-1,1-0,0-2)
02/10/2007 Beostar - Novi Sad 0-4 (0-2,0-1,0-1)
05/10/2007 Beostar - Novi Sad 2-5

Regular season
Wednesday Oct. 10, 2007 Mladost - Partizan 6-3 (1-2,5-1,0-0)
Friday Oct. 12, 2007 Crvena Zvezda - Zagreb 12-0 (4-0,2-0,6-0)
Friday Oct. 12, 2007 Beostar - Vojvodina 4-1 (3-0,1-0,0-1)
Tuesday Oct. 16, 2007 Zagreb - Beostar 6-3 (3-1,3-1,0-1)
Friday, Oct. 19, 2007 Crvena Zvezda - Novi Sad 4-6 (3-0,1-2,0-4)
Friday, Oct. 19, 2007 Vojvodina - Partizan 2-3 OT (0-0,2-0,0-2,0-1)
Tuesday, Oct. 23, 2007 Mladost - Vojvodina 5-4 OT (2-1,2-1,0-2,1-0)
Friday, Oct. 26, 2007 Partizan - Zagreb 3-5 (1-1,2-1,0-3)
Friday, Oct. 26, 2007 Beostar - Novi Sad 1-6 (0-1,1-3,0-2)
Tuesday, Oct. 30, 2007 Zagreb - Mladost 3-7 (0-1,3-4,0-2)
Friday, Nov. 2, 2007 Novi Sad - Partizan 0-3 (0-1,0-0,0-2)
Tuesday, Nov. 13, 2007 Mladost - Novi Sad 5-4 (1-1,1-1,3-2)
Friday, Nov. 16, 2007 Partizan - Crvena Zvezda 10-2 (5-1,3-0,2-1)
Friday, Nov. 16, 2007 Vojvodina - Zagreb 2-3 (0-0,2-0,0-3)
Friday, Nov. 23, 2007 Crvena Zvezda - Mladost 1-5 (0-1,0-3,1-1)
Friday, Nov. 23, 2007 Beostar - Partizan 3-6 (0-3,1-2,2-1)
Friday, Nov. 23, 2007 Novi Sad - Vojvodina 5-3
Tuesday, Nov. 27, 2007 Mladost - Beostar 8-3 (4-0,2-1,2-2)
Friday, Nov. 30, 2007 Crvena Zvezda - Vojvodina 2-5
Saturday, Dec. 8, 2007 Crvena Zvezda - Beostar 4-3 t.a.b. (1-1,2-2,0-0,0-0,1-0)
Friday, Dec. 14, 2007 Partizan - Novi Sad 7-6 (2-2,5-2,0-2)
Friday, Dec. 14, 2007 Beostar - Crvena Zvezda 2-3 t.a.b. (1-2,1-0,0-0,0-0,0-1)
Friday, Dec. 21, 2007 Partizan - Mladost 4-1 (0-0,0-1,4-0)
Friday, Dec. 21, 2007 Zagreb - Crvena Zvezda 1-2 (0-2,1-0,0-0)
Friday, Dec. 21, 2007 Vojvodina - Beostar 2-1
Sunday, Dec. 23, 2007 Mladost - Zagreb 12-5 (4-1,3-1,5-3)
Friday, Jan. 4, 2008 Beostar - Zagreb 2-3 OT (1-0,0-0,1-2,0-1)
Friday, Jan. 4, 2008 Novi Sad - Crvena Zvezda 2-4 (2-2,0-2,0-0)
Friday, Jan. 11, 2008 Vojvodina - Mladost 1-4 (1-0,0-2,0-2)
Friday, Feb. 1, 2008 Crvena Zvezda - Partizan 4-5 (1-2,0-1,3-2)
Friday, Feb. 1, 2008 Novi Sad - Mladost 4-5 OT (1-1,1-1,2-2,0-1)
Sunday, Feb. 3, 2008 Zagreb - Vojvodina 5-10 (2-2,2-6,1-2)
Tuesday, Feb. 5, 2008 Mladost - Crvena Zvezda 6-3 (1-1,3-0,2-2)
Tuesday, Feb. 5, 2008 Partizan - Beostar 5-1 (2-0,0-1,3-0)
Tuesday, Feb. 5, 2008 Vojvodina - Novi Sad 2-3 OT (0-1,0-1,2-0,0-1)
Friday, Feb. 15, 2008 Beostar - Mladost 5-7 (1-3,2-3,2-1)
Friday, Feb. 15, 2008 Crvena Zvezda - Vojvodina 0-8 (0-1,0-4,0-3)
Friday, Feb. 15, 2008 Zagreb - Partizan 1-6 (1-3,0-2,0-1)
Friday, Feb. 15, 2008 Novi Sad - Zagreb 5-0 by forfeit
Sunday, Feb. 17, 2008 Partizan - Vojvodina 3-4 (1-1,0-1,2-2)
Tuesday, Feb. 19, 2008 Zagreb - Novi Sad 2-5
Friday, Feb. 29, 2008 Novi Sad - Beostar 4-2

External links
 Season 2007/08 at www.hockeyarchives.info

Panonian League seasons
Panonian League